Mikaël Zewski (born February 13, 1989) is a Canadian professional boxer. At regional level he has held multiple welterweight titles, including the WBC-NABF title from 2014 to 2015 and the WBO-NABO title from 2019 to 2020.

Amateur career
During his amateur career, Zewski became a four-time Canadian National Champion and achieved a record of 138–29. He won a bronze medal at the 2007 Canada Games, and upset Cuban Carlos Banteux at the 2009 World Amateur Boxing Championships. Zewski beat Jack Culcay two months prior to the World Championships in a Germany-Canada clash. Culcay won the World Championships.

Professional career
Upon turning professional, he was first signed to now defunct TKO Promotions in early 2010. After the end of operations of his original promoter, Mikael became the first Canadian boxer to sign with Oscar De La Hoya's Golden Boy Promotions, but later decided to sign with rival Top Rank.

Professional boxing record

References

External links

Official website

1989 births
Living people
Canadian people of Polish descent
Sportspeople from Trois-Rivières
Welterweight boxers
Canadian male boxers